The Carolina parakeet (Conuropsis carolinensis), or Carolina conure, is an extinct species of small green neotropical parrot with a bright yellow head, reddish orange face and pale beak that was native to the eastern, Midwest and plains states of the United States. It was the only indigenous parrot within its range, as well as one of only three parrot species native to the United States (the others being the thick-billed parrot, now extirpated, and the green parakeet, still present in Texas; a fourth parrot species, the red-crowned amazon, is debated). The Carolina parakeet was found from southern New York and Wisconsin to Kentucky, Tennessee and the Gulf of Mexico, from the Atlantic seaboard to as far west as eastern Colorado. It lived in old-growth forests along rivers and in swamps. It was called puzzi la née ("head of yellow") or pot pot chee by the Seminole and kelinky in Chickasaw. Though formerly prevalent within its range, the bird had become rare by the middle of the 19th century. The last confirmed sighting in the wild was of the ludovicianus subspecies in 1910. The last known specimen perished in captivity at the Cincinnati Zoo in 1918 and the species was declared extinct in 1939.

The earliest reference to these parrots was in 1583 in Florida reported by Sir George Peckham in A True Report of the Late Discoveries of the Newfound Lands of expeditions conducted by English explorer Sir Humphrey Gilbert who notes that explorers in North America "doe testifie that they have found in those countryes; ... parrots." They were first scientifically described in English naturalist Mark Catesby's two volume Natural History of Carolina, Florida and the Bahama Islands published in London in 1731 and 1743.

Carolina parakeets were probably poisonous—American naturalist and painter John J. Audubon noted that cats apparently died from eating them, and they are known to have eaten the toxic seeds of cockleburs.

Taxonomy
 
Carolinensis is a species of the genus Conuropsis, one of numerous genera of New World Neotropical parrots in family Psittacidae of true parrots.

The specific name Psittacus carolinensis was assigned by Swedish zoologist Carl Linnaeus in the 10th edition of Systema Naturae published in 1758. The species was given its own genus Conuropsis by Italian zoologist and ornithologist Tommaso Salvadori in 1891 in his Catalogue of the Birds in the British Museum, volume 20. The name is derived from the Greek-ified conure ("parrot of the genus Conurus" an obsolete name of genus Aratinga) + -opsis ("likeness of") and Latinized Carolina (from Carolana, an English colonial province) + -ensis (of or "from a place"), therefore a bird "like a conure from Carolina."

There are two recognized subspecies. The Louisiana subspecies of the Carolina parakeet, C. c. ludovicianus, was slightly different in color than the nominate subspecies, being more bluish-green and generally of a somewhat subdued coloration, and became extinct in much the same way, but at a somewhat earlier date (early 1910s). The Appalachian Mountains separated these birds from the eastern C. c. carolinensis.

Evolution
According to a study of mitochondrial DNA recovered from museum specimens, their closest living relatives include some of the South American Aratinga parakeets: The Nanday parakeet, the sun parakeet, and the golden-capped parakeet. The authors note the bright yellow and orange plumage and blue wing feathers found in Conuropsis carolinensis are traits shared by another species, the jandaya parakeet (A. jandaya), that was not sampled in the study but is generally thought to be closely related. To help resolve the divergence time a whole genome of a preserved specimen has now been sequenced.  The Carolina parakeet colonized North America about 5.5 million years ago. This was well before North America and South America were joined by the formation of the Panama land bridge about 3.5 mya. Since the Carolina parakeets' more distant relations are geographically closer to its own historic range while its closest relatives are more geographically distant to it, these data are consistent with the generally accepted hypothesis that Central and North America were colonized at different times by distinct lineages of parrots – parrots that originally invaded South America from Antarctica some time after the breakup of Gondwana, where Neotropical parrots originated approximately 50 mya.

The following cladogram shows the placement of the Carolina parakeet among its closest relatives, after a DNA study by Kirchman et al. (2012):

A fossil parrot, designated Conuropsis fratercula, was described based on a single humerus from the Miocene Sheep Creek Formation (possibly late Hemingfordian, c. 16 mya, possibly later) of Snake River, Nebraska. It was a smaller bird, three-quarters the size of the Carolina parakeet. "The present species is of peculiar interest as it represents the first known parrot-like bird to be described as a fossil from North America." (Wetmore 1926; italics added) However, it is not completely certain that the species is correctly assigned to Conuropsis, but some authors consider it a paleosubspecies of the Carolina parakeet.

Description

The Carolina parakeet was a small green parrot very similar in size and coloration to the extant jenday parakeet and sun conure. The majority of the plumage was green with lighter green underparts, a bright yellow head and orange forehead and face extending to behind the eyes and upper cheeks (lores). The shoulders were yellow, continuing down the outer edge of the wings. The primary feathers were mostly green, but with yellow edges on the outer primaries. Thighs were green towards the top and yellow towards the feet. Male and female adults were identical in plumage, however males were slightly larger than females (sexually dimorphic). The legs and feet were light brown. They share the zygodactyl feet of the parrot family. The skin around the eyes was white and the beak was pale flesh colored. These birds weigh about 3.5 oz., are 13 in. long, and have wingspans of 2123 in.

Young Carolina parakeets differed slightly in coloration from adults. The face and entire body was green, with paler underparts. They lacked yellow or orange plumage on the face, wings, and thighs. Hatchlings were covered in mouse-gray down, until about 39–40 days when green wings and tails appear. Fledglings had full adult plumage at around 1 year of age. ("Nature Serve, Conuropsis carolinensis", 2005; Fuller, 2001; Mauler, 2001; Rising, 2004; Snyder and Russell, 2002)

These birds were fairly long lived, at least in captivity - a pair was kept at the Cincinnati Zoo for over 35 years.

Distribution and habitat
 
The Carolina parakeet had the northernmost range of any known parrot. It was found from southern New England and New York and Wisconsin to Kentucky, Tennessee and the Gulf of Mexico. It has also had a wide distribution west of the Mississippi River, as far west as eastern Colorado. Its range was described by early explorers thus: the 43rd parallel as the northern limit, the 26th as the most southern, the 73rd and 106th meridians as the eastern and western boundaries respectively, the range included all or portions of at least 28 states. Its habitats were old-growth wetland forests along rivers and in swamps especially in the Mississippi-Missouri drainage basin with large hollow trees including cypress and sycamore to use as roosting and nesting sites.

Only very rough estimates of the birds' former prevalence can be made: with an estimated range of 20,000 to 2.5 million km2, and population density of 0.5 to 2.0 parrots per km2, population estimates range from tens of thousands to a few million birds (though the densest populations occurred in Florida covering 170,000 km2, so there may have been hundreds of thousands of the birds in that state alone).

The species may have appeared as a very rare vagrant in places as far north as Southern Ontario. A few bones, including a pygostyle found at the Calvert Site in Southern Ontario, came from the Carolina parakeet. The possibility remains open that this specimen was taken to Southern Ontario for ceremonial purposes.

Behavior and diet
 
The bird lived in huge, noisy flocks of as many as 200–300 birds. It built its nest in a hollow tree, laying two to five (most accounts say two)  round white eggs.

It mostly ate the seeds of forest trees and shrubs including those of cypress, hackberry, beech, sycamore, elm, pine, maple, oak, and other plants such as thistles and sandspurs (Cenchrus species). It also ate fruits, including apples, grapes and figs (often from orchards by the time of its decline), as well as flower buds and, occasionally, insects. It was especially noted for its predilection for cockleburs (Xanthium strumarium), a plant which contains a toxic glucoside, and it was considered to be an agricultural pest of grain crops.

Extinction

The last captive Carolina parakeet, Incas, died at the Cincinnati Zoo on February 21, 1918, in the same cage as Martha, the last passenger pigeon, who died in 1914. There are no scientific studies or surveys of this bird by American naturalists; most information about it is from anecdotal accounts and museum specimens. Therefore, details of its prevalence and decline are unverified or speculative.

There are extensive accounts of the pre-colonial and early colonial prevalence of this bird. The existence of flocks of gregarious, very colorful and raucous parrots could hardly have gone unnoted by European explorers, as parrots were virtually unknown in seafaring European nations in the 16th and 17th centuries. Later accounts in the latter half of the 19th century onward noted the birds' sparseness and absence.

Genetic evidence suggests that while populations had been in decline since the last glacial maximum, the lack of evidence of inbreeding suggests that the birds declined very quickly.

The birds' range collapsed from east to west with settlement and clearing of the eastern and southern deciduous forests. John J. Audubon commented as early as 1832 on the decline of the birds. The bird was rarely reported outside Florida after 1860. The last reported sighting east of the Mississippi River (except Florida) was in 1878 in Kentucky. By the turn of the century it was restricted to the swamps of central Florida. The last known wild specimen was killed in Okeechobee County, Florida, in 1904, and the last captive bird died at the Cincinnati Zoo on February 21, 1918. This was the male specimen, called "Incas," who died within a year of his mate, "Lady Jane." Additional reports of the bird were made in Okeechobee County, Florida, until the late 1920s, but these are not supported by specimens. It was not until 1939, however, that the American Ornithologists' Union declared that the Carolina parakeet had become extinct. The IUCN has listed the species as extinct since 1920.
 
In 1937, three parakeets resembling this species were sighted and filmed in the Okefenokee Swamp of Georgia. However, the American Ornithologists' Union analyzed the film and concluded that they had probably filmed feral parakeets. A year later, in 1938, a flock of parakeets was apparently sighted by a group of experienced ornithologists in the swamps of the Santee River basin in South Carolina. However, this sighting was doubted by most other ornithologists. The birds were never seen again after this sighting, and shortly after a portion of the area was destroyed to make way for power lines, making the species' continued existence unlikely.

About 720 skins and 16 skeletons are housed in museums around the world and analyzable DNA has been extracted from them.

Reasons for extinction

The evidence is indicative that humans had at least a contributory role in the extinction of the Carolina parakeet, through a variety of means. Chief was deforestation in the 18th and 19th centuries. Hunting played a significant role, both for decorative use of their colorful feathers, for example, adornment of women's hats, and for reduction of crop predation. This was partially offset by the recognition of their value in controlling invasive cockleburs. Minor roles were played by capture for the pet trade and, as noted in Pacific Standard, by the introduction for crop pollination of European honeybees that competed for nest sites.

A factor that exacerbated their decline to extinction was the flocking behavior that led them to return to the vicinity of dead and dying birds (e.g., birds downed by hunting), enabling wholesale slaughter.

The final extinction of the species in the early years of the 20th century is somewhat of a mystery, as it happened so rapidly. Vigorous flocks with many juveniles and reproducing pairs were noted as late as 1896, and the birds were long-lived in captivity, but they had virtually disappeared by 1904. Sufficient nest sites remained intact, so deforestation was not the final cause. American ornithologist Noel F. Snyder speculates that the most likely cause seems to be that the birds succumbed to poultry disease, although no recent or historical records exist of New World parrot populations being afflicted by domestic poultry diseases. The modern poultry scourge Newcastle disease was not detected until 1926 in Indonesia, and only a subacute form of it was reported in the United States in 1938. As well, genetic research on samples did not show any significant presence of bird viruses (though this does not solely rule out disease).

See also
 Incas (Carolina parakeet), the last Carolina parakeet alive in captivity.
 Thick-billed parrot, one of two living parrots that had a native range in the contiguous United States; now restricted to Mexico
 Green parakeet, the other living U.S. parrot, found in southern Texas
 Monk parakeet, a prevalent feral parrot in the United States, often incorrectly presumed to be native
 Feral parrots, other non-native parrots in the United States

Footnotes

References

Further reading
 Cokinos, Christopher (2009) Hope Is the Thing with Feathers: A Personal Chronicle of Vanished Birds (Chapter 1: Carolina Parakeet), Tarcher 
 Snyder, Noel (2004) The Carolina Parakeet: Glimpses of a Vanished Bird, Princeton University Press 
 Julian P. Hume, Michael Walters (2012) Extinct Birds (p. 186), Poyser Monographs

External links

 
 Species profile - World Parrot Trust
 Fact file – ARKive
 "Carolina Parakeet (Conuropsis carolinensis) and Passenger Pigeon (Ectopistes migratorius)" - Carolina Nature
 "Carolina Parakeet: Removal of a Menace" - Cornell Lab of Ornithology
 "The Extinct Carolina Parakeet" - Ivory Bill
 News - City Parrots

Carolina parakeet
Extinct birds of North America
Bird extinctions since 1500
Species made extinct by human activities
Native birds of the Eastern United States
Extinct animals of the United States
Carolina parakeet
1939 in the environment
Articles containing video clips
Carolina parakeet